Litega is a rural locality (a village) and the administrative center of Prigorodnoye Rural Settlement, Sokolsky District, Vologda Oblast, Russia. The population was 797 as of 2002.

Geography 
Litega is located 13 km southeast of Sokol (the district's administrative centre) by road. Vasyutino is the nearest rural locality.

References 

Rural localities in Sokolsky District, Vologda Oblast